Attenuation is the gradual loss in intensity of any kind of flux through a medium, including:
 Acoustic attenuation, the loss of sound energy in a viscous medium
 Anelastic attenuation factor, a way to describe attenuation of seismic energy in the Earth

Attenuation (or verb attenuate) may also refer to:
 Attenuation (botany)
 Attenuation (brewing), the percent of sugar converted to alcohol and carbon dioxide by the yeast in brewing
 Attenuation coefficient, a basic quantity used in calculations of the penetration of materials by quantum particles or other energy beams
 Mass attenuation coefficient, a measurement of how strongly a chemical species or substance absorbs or scatters light at a given wavelength, per unit mass
 Regression attenuation or Regression dilution, a cause of statistical bias
 The process of producing an attenuated vaccine by reducing the virulence of a pathogen
 Attenuation constant, the real part of the propagation constant
 Attenuator (genetics), form of regulation in prokaryotic cells.

See also 
 Attenuation distortion
 Attenuator (disambiguation)